The Baltimore Bullets were an American basketball team based in Baltimore, Maryland that was a member of the Eastern Professional Basketball League.  The Bullets played in the Eastern League for three seasons, and its roster of players included former University of Kentucky center Bill Spivey, who helped the Bullets win the league championship in the 1960–61 season.

After the 1960/61 season, the team became the Camden Bullets.

Year-by-year

References

Continental Basketball Association teams
Defunct basketball teams in the United States
Basketball teams in Baltimore
Basketball teams established in 1958
Sports clubs disestablished in 1961
1958 establishments in Maryland
1961 disestablishments in Maryland
Defunct sports teams in Maryland